The 2003–04 BBL season was the 17th campaign in the history of the British Basketball League.

Teams

Notable occurrences 
 Due to uncertainty regarding the future of Aston Events Centre, the Birmingham Bullets were forced to relocate to a new home venue. Their first games of the campaign were postponed until a suitable venue could be found, with the owner Craig Bown eventually acquiring the use of Birmingham Sports Centre for the duration of the season.
 With their 68–66 win in the BBL Trophy Final against Brighton Bears, Chester Jets made history as the first team to win the Trophy for four consecutive seasons.

BBL championship (Tier 1)

Final standings

The play-offs

Quarter-finals

Semi-finals

Final

EBL National League Division 1 (Tier 2)

Final standings

Haribo Cup 
This season saw the first edition of the newly created Haribo Cup. Following the BBL's decision to withdraw from the National Cup due to import player regulations, the League's newest competition saw all 10 teams competing in a knock-out style tournament culminating in the Grand Final at the National Indoor Arena in Birmingham.

First round

Quarter-finals

Semi-finals

Final

BBL Trophy 
Due to the lack of teams competing in this season's Championship, the BBL Trophy featured all 10 BBL teams plus two invited teams from the English Basketball League (Plymouth Raiders and Teesside Mohawks). The First round saw all 12 teams divided into four regionalised groups with the top finishing team advancing to the Semi-finals.

Group stage 

Northern Group 1

Southern Group 1

Northern Group 2

Southern Group 2

Semi-finals

Final

Statistics leaders

References 

British Basketball League seasons
1
British